Mario Prayer (1887-1959) was an Italian painter, mainly of frescoes for churches or large halls. He collaborated closely with his brother, Guido, in many projects.

Biography
He was born in Turin to Roberto Prayer Galletti, a photographer from Venice and Giovanna Boccaccini, also from Venice. Despite being without the use of his right hand, along with his brother Guido, he trained first at the Accademia di Belle Arti di Venezia and then at the Academy of Fine Arts of Lyon.

Both brothers were called in 1915 to paint for the Superintendent of Fine Arts of Apulia and Calabria, and the brothers mainly worked in Apulia and Basilicata, including Bari and Brindisi. He painted works for the Fascist authorities. His style shows the influences of Art Nouveau orStilo Liberty. He died in Rome.

In 1924, he had a girl named Liliana Prayer, in Bare, Italy. She died in 2002.

Among his works, mainly in fresco are:
 Allegory of the Province of Brindisi, 1949, Palazzo della Provincia, Brindisi
 Frescoes/encaustics 1924, Aula Magna, University of Bari
 Frescoes, 1921, Council Hall of Toritto, Apulia 1921
 Frescoes, 1927, Sala Giuseppina or Cinema Oriente of Kursaal Santalucia, Bari
 Frescoes, 1933–34, Potenza Cathedral, Potenza
 Frescoes, 1933, Chiesa dell’Immacolata nel quartiere Tiburtino, Rome
 Frescoes depicting Life of Mary, 1942, Basilica Madonna della Coltura, Parabita
 Frescoes, 1930, Palazzo di Città, Bari
 Oil on Panel, Madonna del Carmine, 1949, Chiesa Matrice, Parish church of Monteroni
 Other works are found in Gioia del Colle, Gravina, Foggia, Galatone, and Genzano di Lucania.

References

1887 births
1959 deaths
20th-century Italian painters
Italian male painters
Accademia di Belle Arti di Venezia alumni
20th-century Italian male artists